Diplonevra nitidula is a species of scuttle flies (insects in the family Phoridae).

References

Further reading

 Diptera.info
 NCBI Taxonomy Browser, Diplonevra nitidula
 

Phoridae